Derrick Paul Brown (born September 8, 1987) is an American former professional basketball player.

High school career
Considered a three-star recruit by Rivals.com, Brown was listed as the No. 26 small forward and the No. 115 player in the nation in 2005.

College career
Brown played college basketball at Xavier University with Xavier Musketeers, from 2005 to 2009.

Professional career

Charlotte Bobcats (2009–2012) 
Brown entered the 2009 NBA draft, and was selected 40th overall by the Charlotte Bobcats.

On July 13, 2009, he was signed to a two-year contract by the Charlotte Bobcats. On February 24, 2011, Derrick Brown was waived by the Bobcats after a trade with the Thunder that sent Nazr Mohammed to the Thunder. The New York Knicks announced on March 1, 2011 that they had claimed Brown off waivers.

On December 9, 2011, he returned to the Bobcats with a one-year minimum deal. Over 65 games in 2011–12 NBA season, which was shortened to 66 games due to 2011 NBA lockout, Brown averaged career-high 8.1 points, 3.6 rebounds and 1 assist per game.

On June 29, 2012, the Bobcats extended a qualifying to Brown, making him a restricted free agent. However, on July 18, 2012, the Bobcats withdrew the offer, making him an unrestricted free agent. On September 27, 2012, Brown signed with the San Antonio Spurs. However, he did not make the team's final roster.

Lokomotiv Kuban (2012–2015)
On October 31, 2012, Brown signed a three-year contract with the Russian team Lokomotiv Kuban Krasnodar. He was named to the All-EuroCup Second Team in 2013. In 2013–14 season, he debuted in European top-tier EuroLeague. Over 23 EuroLeague games with Lokomotiv Kuban, he averaged 13.9 points, 4.5 rebounds, 1.7 assists and 1.4 steals per game.

Anadolu Efes (2015–2018)
On June 23, 2015, Brown signed a two-year contract with the Turkish club Anadolu Efes. On June 21, 2017, he signed a two-year contract extension with Efes. In 2017–18 season, his third with the team, Brown's role and productivity decreased significantly. Over 19 EuroLeague games, he averaged 7.2 points and 2.3 rebounds per game. After the season, he parted ways with the club and was inactive for the whole 2018–19 season.

Crvena zvezda (2019–2020)
On June 27, 2019, he signed a one-year deal with the Serbian club Crvena zvezda. He was waived on February 3, 2020.

Career statistics

NBA

Regular season

|-
| align="left" | 
| align="left" | Charlotte
| 57 || 0 || 9.4 || .463 || .286 || .667 || 1.4 || .3 || .4 || .2 || 3.3
|-
| align="left" | 
| align="left" | Charlotte
| 41 || 1 || 11.9 || .549 || .333 || .532 || 2.0 || .7 || .4 || .2 || 3.7
|-
| align="left" | 
| align="left" | New York
| 8 || 0 || 11.0 || .667 || .750 || .538 || 1.9 || .5 || .5 || .3 || 4.3
|-
| align="left" | 
| align="left" | Charlotte
| 65 || 17 || 22.2 || .518 || .250 || .667 || 3.6 || 1.0 || .7 || .2 || 8.1
|- class="sortbottom"
| style="text-align:center;" colspan=2 | Career
| 171 || 18 || 14.9 || .515 || .317 || .637 || 2.4 || .7 || .5 || .2 || 5.2

Playoffs

|-
| align="left" | 2010
| align="left" | Charlotte
| 2 || 0 || .5 || 1.000 || .000 || .000 || .0 || .0 || .0 || .0 || 1.0
|- class="sortbottom"
| style="text-align:center;" colspan=2 | Career
| 2 || 0 || .5 || 1.000 || .000 || .000 || .0 || .0 || .0 || .0 || 1.0

EuroLeague

|-
| style="text-align:left;"| 2013–14
| style="text-align:left;"| Lokomotiv Kuban
| 23 || 23 || 28.8 || .568 || .333 || .714 || 4.5 || 1.7 || 1.4 || .4 || 13.9 || 16.2
|-
| style="text-align:left;"| 2015–16
| style="text-align:left;" rowspan=3 | Anadolu Efes
| 24 || 6 || 23.2 || .451 || .256 || .631 || 5.3 || 1.4 || .5 || .5 || 9.8 || 11.6
|-
| style="text-align:left;"| 2016–17
| 35 || 35 || 29.3 || .491 || .293 || .767 || 5.5 || 2.2 || 1.0 || .5 || 12.3 || 15.3
|-
| style="text-align:left;"| 2017–18
| 19 || 6 || 20.5 || .400 || .379 || .850 || 2.3 || 1.6 || .6 || .2 || 7.2 || 5.6
|- class="sortbottom"
| style="text-align:center;" colspan=2 | Career
| 101 || 70 || 26.1 || .488 || .304 || .725 || 4.6 || 1.8 || .9 || .4 || 11.1 || 12.8

References

External links

 
 eurobasket.com profile
 EuroLeague profile
 Xavier Musketeers bio
 

1987 births
Living people
20th-century African-American people
21st-century African-American sportspeople
ABA League players
African-American basketball players
American expatriate basketball people in Russia
American expatriate basketball people in Serbia
American expatriate basketball people in Turkey
American men's basketball players
Anadolu Efes S.K. players
Basketball players from Dayton, Ohio
Basketball players from Oakland, California
Charlotte Bobcats draft picks
Charlotte Bobcats players
KK Crvena zvezda players
New York Knicks players
PBC Lokomotiv-Kuban players
Power forwards (basketball)
Small forwards
Xavier Musketeers men's basketball players